Al-Dreij is a Syrian village in the Al-Tall District of the Rif Dimashq Governorate. According to the Syria Central Bureau of Statistics (CBS), Al-Dreij had a population of 1,769 in the 2004 census.

References

External links 

Populated places in Al-Tall District